Qaleh Now-e Abgheh (also Romanized as Qal‘eh Now-e Ābgheh and Qal‘eh Now-e Ābqah; also known as Ābgheh and Qal‘eh-ye Now) is a village in Karat Rural District, in the Central District of Taybad County, Razavi Khorasan Province, Iran. At the 2006 census, its population was 666, in 136 families.

References 

Populated places in Taybad County